William Feilding, 3rd Earl of Denbigh, 2nd Earl of Desmond (29 December 1640 – 23 August 1685) was an aristocrat in the Peerage of England. He was the son of George Feilding, 1st Earl of Desmond, and his wife, the former Bridget Stanhope, daughter of Sir Michael Stanhope.

Feilding inherited the title of Earl of Denbigh from his paternal uncle Basil Feilding, 2nd Earl of Denbigh, who died without heirs in 1675.

He married, firstly, Mary King (died 1669), daughter of Sir Robert King and Frances Folliott, daughter of Henry Folliott, 1st Baron Folliott and Anne Strode, and widow of Sir William Meredyth. Secondly, he married Lady Mary Carey, daughter of Henry Carey, 2nd Earl of Monmouth. He died on 23 August 1685 at age 44.
By his first wife, Mary King, Feilding had the following children:

Lady Mary Feilding (c. 1668 – c. December 1697), who married Evelyn Pierrepont, 1st Duke of Kingston-upon-Hull, and had children.
Basil Feilding, 4th Earl of Denbigh (1668 – 18 March 1717), who married Hester Firebrace, and had children

There were no children from the earl's second marriage.

References

1640 births
1685 deaths
William
Members of the Irish House of Lords
Earls of Denbigh
Desmond, William Feilding, 2nd Earl of